The United Nations Educational, Scientific and Cultural Organization (UNESCO) World Heritage Sites are places of importance to cultural or natural heritage as described in the UNESCO World Heritage Convention, established in 1972. Finland accepted the convention on 4 March 1987, making its historical sites eligible for inclusion on the list. The first two sites added to the list were Old Rauma and the Fortress of Suomenlinna, both in 1991, at the 15th Session of the World Heritage Committee, held in Carthage, Tunisia.  Further sites were added in 1994, 1996, 1999, 2005, and 2006.

As of 2020, there are seven World Heritage Sites in Finland, six of which are classified as cultural sites according to the UNESCO criteria, and one natural site, the High Coast / Kvarken Archipelago. This is a transnational site and is shared with Sweden. The Swedish part, the High Coast, was listed individually in 2000; the Kvarken Archipelago was added in 2006. There is another transnational site in Finland, the Struve Geodetic Arc, a cultural site listed in 2005, which is shared with nine other countries. In addition to its World Heritage Sites, Finland also maintains three properties on its tentative list.



World Heritage Sites 
UNESCO lists sites under ten criteria; each entry must meet at least one of the criteria. Criteria i through vi are cultural, and vii through x are natural.

Tentative list
In addition to sites inscribed on the World Heritage List, member states can maintain a list of tentative sites that they may consider for nomination. Nominations for the World Heritage List are only accepted if the site was previously listed on the tentative list. As of 2021, Finland lists two properties on its tentative list.

See also

Tourism in Finland

References

Finland
World Heritage Sites